Echinoderes obtuspinosus is a species of mud dragons first found in coastal and subtidal locations around the Korean Peninsula and in the East China Sea.

References

Further reading
 Sørensen, Martin V. "First account of echinoderid kinorhynchs from Brazil, with the description of three new species." Marine Biodiversity 44.3 (2014): 251-274.

External links

Kinorhyncha
Animals described in 2012